Waipio is a census-designated place (CDP) located in the Ewa District of the island of Oahu in the City & County of Honolulu, Hawaii, United States. In Hawaiian, wai pio means "curved water". As of the 2020 census, the CDP had a population of 12,082.

The U.S. ZIP Code for Waipio is 96797.

History
In ancient Hawaii, the Battle of Kīpapa Gulch was said to have taken place at Kīpapa Gulch in Waipio. Maʻilikākahi was the mōī of Oahu at the time. The battle began at Waikakalaua Gulch in the adjacent ahupuaa of Waikele. It eventually made its way into Kīpapa Gulch. The raiding party was defeated, and it is said that the gulch was "paved with the corpses of the slain."

Geography 
Waipi'o is located at  (21.418050, -157.997988), south of Mililani Town via either Interstate H-2 or Kamehameha Highway (Hawaii Route 99). The town is immediately east of Waikele, separated by Kamehameha Highway, the road that leads southward to Farrington Highway (Hawaii Route 90) with connections then to Pearl City to the east and Waipahu to the west. In this same area south of Waipi'o is the interchange between Hawai'i Interstates H-1 and H-2 at Waiawa. Neighborhoods include Crestview.

Demographics 

As of the census of 2000, there were 11,672 people, 3,974 households, and 2,873 families residing in the CDP. The racial makeup of the CDP was 14.42% White, 2.82% African American, 0.18% Native American, 54.66% Asian, 5.45% Pacific Islander, 0.86% from other races, and 21.62% from two or more races. Hispanic or Latino of any race were 6.76% of the population.

There were 3,974 households, out of which 38.6% had children under the age of 18 living with them, 57.1% were married couples living together, 10.5% had a female householder with no husband present, and 27.7% were non-families. 20.9% of all households were made up of individuals, and 2.2% had someone living alone who was 65 years of age or older.  The average household size was 2.92 and the average family size was 3.41.

In the CDP the population was spread out, with 26.2% under the age of 18, 9.3% from 18 to 24, 34.6% from 25 to 44, 23.4% from 45 to 64, and 6.5% who were 65 years of age or older.  The median age was 34 years.  For every 100 females there were 101.1 males.  For every 100 females age 18 and over, there were 100.0 males.

The median income for a household in the CDP was $61,276, and the median income for a family was $69,282. Males had a median income of $41,943 versus $31,840 for females. The per capita income for the CDP was $24,451.  About 3.3% of families and 4.1% of the population were below the poverty line, including 5.1% of those under the age of 18 and 7.0% of those 65 and older.

Government and infrastructure

The Hawaii Department of Public Safety operates the Waiawa Correctional Facility, a minimum security prison near Waipio.

In 2017, the state approved NRG Energy, Inc., to build a 45.9 megawatt Waipio solar farm project north of Costco near Waiawa and H-2 in Waipio. Hawaiian Electric Companies (HECO) will buy electricity from this solar farm at 10.4 cents per kilowatt-hour (kWh) for 22 years. On September 10, 2019, the 45.9 megawatt Waipio Solar developed by Clearway Energy Group began its operation. Originally started by the developer SunEdison, Hawaiian Electric broke its ties to the firm in February 2016 before SunEdison's bankruptcy proceedings. San Francisco-based Clearway's predecessor the NRG Energy's Community Solar division, took over the project at the end of November 2016. On January 22, 2019, the Clearway Energy Group obtained NRG Community Solar's assets.

In March 2019, the Public Utilities Commission approved Clearway Energy Group to build a 36 megawatt with 144 megawatt-hour storage solar farm plus battery storage project near Waipio called Waiawa Solar. HECO will buy electricity from this solar-plus-storage project at 10 cents per kilowatt-hour (kWh). The Waiawa Solar project is expected to be completed by Clearway and go online at the end of 2021.

Education
Hawaii Department of Education operates public schools. Kanoelani Elementary School is in the Waipio CDP.

Recreation

Little League World Series
In 2008, the team from Waipio LL, representing Hawaii and the United States, captured the Little League World Series crown, beating Matamoros LL, Mexico 12–3 in 6 innings. Iolana Akau started with a solo blast earlier in the game and Tanner Tokunaga added two homers later in the game. Waipio is the second team from the Ewa District to win the world championship; 'Ewa Beach representing West O'ahu won the title in 2005.

In 2010, the Waipio LL team won the U.S. championship of the Little League World Series, defeating Pearland White LL from Pearland, Texas on August 28, 2010, by a score of 10-0 after 5 innings, which invoked the Little League "mercy rule" where a team is leading by 10 runs or more after 4 innings.  They lost in a close 4–1 game to Edogawa Minami LL of Tokyo, Japan on August 29, 2010, in the Series final.

See also
Central Oahu Regional Park

References

Census-designated places in Honolulu County, Hawaii